Elias Olsson (born 23 April 2003) is a Swedish professional footballer who plays as a centre-back for Kalmar FF.

References

2003 births
Living people
Swedish footballers
Association football defenders
IFK Malmö Fotboll players
Kalmar FF players
FC Groningen players
Næstved Boldklub players
Allsvenskan players
Eredivisie players
Danish 1st Division players
Swedish expatriate footballers
Expatriate footballers in the Netherlands
Swedish expatriate sportspeople in the Netherlands
Expatriate men's footballers in Denmark
Swedish expatriate sportspeople in Denmark
People from Burlöv Municipality